The  ("The Saarland Tune") was the national anthem of the Saar Protectorate from 1947 to 1957. After World War II, the Saarland was an autonomous state and economically attached to France. On the occasion of the first game of the Saarland national football team in 1950 against Switzerland, a separate national anthem was therefore necessary. They chose the song "I know where a lovely, friendly valley is", also known as the Saarlandlied.

Saarland
Regional songs